The 1975 Daytona 500, the 17th running of the event on February 16, 1975, was a race in the NASCAR Winston Cup Series.

Race report
From the start, it appeared that David Pearson was on his way to his first Daytona 500 victory as he built a sizable lead on second place Benny Parsons late in the race. However, Richard Petty, eight laps behind the leaders due to a leaking radiator which needed frequent pit stops to replenish, and Parsons hooked up in a draft and began reeling in Pearson who was slowed by lapped traffic. The key moment of the race occurred two laps from the end when contact with Cale Yarborough in traffic sent Pearson spinning on the backstretch. Parsons avoided the accident and went on to take the win.

One of the things that set up the late incident that cost David Pearson the race was the fact that Cale Yarborough was running on 7 cylinders. On the final restart, Cale was placed in front of the leaders, on the end of the lead lap, but the power deficit he was at resulted in the leaders lapping him in less than 25 laps. When Pearson caught up to Yarborough and Richie Panch, Yarborough was trying to slip in behind Pearson and simply misjudged it. Of course, another was the role Richard Petty played. Even in a two-car draft with Ramo Stott (who barely missed the massive lap 4 crash), Parsons was losing ground to Pearson, who was content to draft A.J. Foyt, but Foyt dropped out with nine laps left while running third, not long after Petty got back onto the track after his final pit stop, and where he came out was a stroke of luck for Parsons and Stott, because he came out exactly where they were running.

As per the list below, 26 of the 40 drivers failed to finish the race for various reasons, including a huge crash on the fourth lap, which took out nine cars, nearly one-quarter of the field.

West Coast ace Hershel McGriff's third and final Daytona 500 ends with a blown motor on lap 13. Bruce Jacobi would debut in this race, finishing in 12th place after qualifying in 39th place.

Among those involved were famous country music singer Marty Robbins, who also crashed out of the 1973 Daytona 500.

At the time, it was the biggest crash in terms of the number of cars involved in race history. Donnie Allison started on the pole, but only led the first lap and was sidelined by mechanical problems, as was DiGard Racing teammate Johnny Rutherford, the reigning Indianapolis 500 champion. Another that failed to finish was Buddy Baker, who led 46 laps. As a result, a record-low 14 cars, including that of Pearson, were classified as running at the finish.

None of the 40 cars in this year's Daytona 500 had a single-digit car number.

Finishing order

 Benny Parsons
 Bobby Allison
 Cale Yarborough
 David Pearson
 Ramo Stott
 Dave Marcis
 Richard Petty
 Richie Panch
 G.C. Spencer
 James Hylton
 A. J. Foyt*
 Bruce Jacobi
 Bob Burcham*
 Ed Negre
 Cecil Gordon*
 Ferrel Harris
 Coo Coo Marlin*
 Richard Childress
 Lennie Pond*
 Buddy Baker*
 David Sisco*
 Dick Brooks*
 Tommy Gale*
 George Follmer*
 Walter Ballard*
 Darrell Waltrip*
 Johnny Rutherford*
 Donnie Allison*
 Randy Tissot*
 Hershel McGriff*
 Rick Newsom*
 Bruce Hill*
 J. D. McDuffie*
 Joe Mihalic*
 Jim Vandiver*
 Dick Trickle*
 Grant Adcox*
 Dan Daughtry*
 Marty Robbins*
 Warren Tope*

Note: * denotes that the driver failed to finish the race.

Standings after the race

References

External links
 NASCAR.COM – Daytona Countdown: '75 – Jan 20, 2005

Daytona 500
Daytona 500
Daytona 500
NASCAR races at Daytona International Speedway